Moose Harris is a British bass guitarist, who was known as Jason James Harris until June 2001, when he legally changed his name to reflect his former nickname and adopted professional alias of "Moose".

Biography
Although born in Devizes (Wiltshire, England), Harris never lived there, being raised and schooled in the Wiltshire village of Pewsey. He left Pewsey Vale School at 15, and tried several dead end jobs before beginning an apprenticeship as an electronics engineer in 1984. At the age of seventeen, Harris was recruited by New Model Army to replace original bass player Stuart Morrow (1980–85) who had left the band midway through the 1985 'No Rest for the Wicked' tour.

He toured extensively with the band over the next five years, playing at venues across Europe, the United States and Japan. He also contributed to New Model Army's milestone albums, The Ghost of Cain (1986) and Thunder and Consolation (1989), before leaving in 1990, when he was replaced by Peter "Nelson" Nice. In late 1992 he joined punk/goth rock band, The Damned. Having recorded the Not of This Earth album with them during 1994, he left in mid-1995 following the dissolution of that line-up. When the band reformed in 1996, he was replaced by former The Damned and Eddie and the Hot Rods bassist, Paul Gray.

After The Damned split in 1995, Moose moved away from music as a professional career, but still maintained a relationship with the business through music tuition, session work and music production. Although Dave Vanian offered Moose a chance to return to The Damned in 1996, the promised tour never materialised, and Vanian's future wife Patricia Morrison took over as bass guitarist soon after. Between 1996 and 2007, Harris was the bass guitarist for Pants with former Lurkers drummer, Dan Tozer, guitarist Fal and a succession of singers including Sean Wratten, Ivor Richards and Ian Oliver. When Pants split, Harris and Oliver collaborated on the self-described "retro-futurist synth rock" duo The Pieshop Boys, appearing sporadically between 2008 and 2013. Pants reformed in 2014 and still perform occasionally.

Since 2000 he has contributed to a number of diverse projects, including live and studio work with folk-rock group Pig Country, nine-piece ska band Ska Trouble, and punk band Bastard Squad. He also assisted with the restoration of the hitherto unreleased album by Raspberry Parade, a psychedelic work masterminded by Steve Marshall, using the long lost recordings of Brian Heddon.

In 2005, he became one-third of the band Sleeper Cell, an unusual full-band project for singer/songwriter and acoustic guitarist Nick Harper. Sleeper Cell also featured Dan Tozer on drums. The band toured briefly in the Autumn of 2005, including an appearance at the Beautiful Days Festival.

In 2011, director Matt Reid interviewed Moose at his home for a documentary about New Model Army. The finished film, Between Dog and Wolf: the New Model Army Story premièred in London on 5 October 2014, at Piccadilly Vue, as part of the Raindance Film Festival 2014. The documentary was released on DVD in the UK on 5 December 2015.

Albums

New Model Army
Studio albums
The Ghost of Cain (1986)
Thunder and Consolation (1989)

Live albums
All of This – The "Live" Rarities (1999)

Compilations
Radio Sessions '83-'84 (1985)
B-Sides and Abandoned Tracks (1994)
History - The Singles 85-91 (1992)
New Model Army 3 x CD (2000)
The Best (2001)
Lost Songs (2002)
Great Expectations – The Singles Collection (2003)
Original 20 (2004)
The Collection (2004)
Anthology 1980-2010 (2010)

Atom Heart Mother
Studio albums
Skin 'em Up, Chop 'em Out, Rawhide! (1992)

The Damned
Studio albums
Not of This Earth (1995)

Live albums
Molten Lager (1999)

Compilations
CBGB's 20th Anniversary - Live (1995)
Testify (1997)
Industrial Mix Machine (1997)
Vampire Themes (1997)
Goths Undead (1997)

Session work
Luminous - Big Wheel (1993)
Monty - A Typical Scorpio (1993, tracks 'Come into My Parlour' and 'Can You Do The Mashed Potato?')

References

External links

English rock bass guitarists
Male bass guitarists
Living people
The Damned (band) members
People from Pewsey
New Model Army (band) members
Year of birth missing (living people)